Jodi Hakki is a 1997 Indian Kannada-language musical romance film written and directed by D. Rajendra Babu, produced  by P. Dhanraj and starring Shiva Rajkumar, Charulatha and Vijayalakshmi.

The film received critical acclaim upon release and won two State awards for screenplay and music. The film has musical score by V. Manohar which is often considered to be one of his best compositions.

The film revolves around a nomadic tribal who unwillingly relocates to the city where he gains popularity as a singer but gets separated from his lover.

Cast 
 Shiva Rajkumar as Maacha / Manoj
 Charulatha as Laali
 Vijayalakshmi
 Harish Rai as Vikki
 Kishori Ballal
 Mandeep Roy
Shani Mahadevappa
Ashok rao
Manjunath Hegde
Master Santhosh

Soundtrack 
The music of the film was composed and lyrics written by V. Manohar. Actor Rajkumar recorded a song "Hara Hara Gange" which became huge hit.

Awards 
Karnataka State Film Awards
Karnataka State Film Award for Best Screenplay – D. Rajendra Babu
Karnataka State Film Award for Best Music Director – V. Manohar

References 

1997 films
1990s Kannada-language films
1997 romantic drama films
Indian romantic drama films
Films scored by V. Manohar
Films directed by D. Rajendra Babu